The Congo golden mole (Huetia leucorhina) is a species of mammal in the family Chrysochloridae. It is found in Angola, Cameroon, Central African Republic, Republic of the Congo, and Democratic Republic of the Congo. Its natural habitats are subtropical or tropical forest, arable land, pastureland, plantations, and rural gardens.

Golden moles have been found to have ossicles that are larger than other similar organism. These ossicles are believed to allow to sense seismic vibrations, allowing them to be able to sense where they are and compensating for their bad eyesight

References

Afrosoricida
Taxonomy articles created by Polbot
Mammals described in 1885